is a railway station on Kintetsu Railway's Kyoto Line in Seika, Kyoto, Japan.

Lines
Kintetsu Railway
Kyoto Line

Building
The station has 2 platforms and 2 tracks.

Platforms

Around the Station
  Route 163 
 AL PLAZA
 Welca
 Yamadasō Post office

History
 1928 - The Station opens when Nara Electric Railway Momoyamagoryo-mae to Saidaji open
 1963 - NER merges with Kintetsu
 2007 - Starts using PiTaPa

Adjacent stations

Railway stations in Japan opened in 1928
Railway stations in Kyoto Prefecture